Charles William Jackson Falkinder,  (29 August 1921 – 11 July 1993) was an Australian air force officer and politician.

Born in Hobart, Tasmania, he was educated at Hobart High School and served in the Royal Australian Air Force (RAAF) from 1940 to 1945 during the Second World War. Attached to the Royal Air Force's Bomber Command and later Pathfinder Force for much of this time, Falkinder flew some 117 missions over occupied Europe and was decorated with the Distinguished Service Order, Distinguished Flying Cross and Bar. He continued to serve in the RAAF Reserve after the war, rising to the rank of wing commander.

In 1946 he was elected to the Australian House of Representatives as the Liberal member for Franklin, narrowly defeating Labor minister Charles Frost with a ten percent swing. He held the seat until his retirement in 1966. Appointed a Commander of the Order of the British Empire for his service, Bill Falkinder died in 1993.

References

1921 births
1993 deaths
20th-century Australian politicians
Australian Commanders of the Order of the British Empire
Australian Companions of the Distinguished Service Order
Australian recipients of the Distinguished Flying Cross (United Kingdom)
Australian World War II pilots
Liberal Party of Australia members of the Parliament of Australia
Members of the Australian House of Representatives for Franklin
Politicians from Hobart
Royal Australian Air Force officers
Royal Australian Air Force personnel of World War II